Pillow People are rectangular stuffed toys (pillows) with decal faces and stuffed hands & feet attached to their bodies. The line was started in 1986 by Penny Ekstein-Lieberman and was produced by Springs Industries (and later PSE Marketing). The toys were popular during the late 1980s and generated $120 million in sales. The line featured an array of different characters such as animals and people. Besides the 'people' of the line, there are also pillow pets—such as cats and dogs. Additional merchandise included bed sheets imprinted with Pillow People characters, figurines and books. There was also a Christmas TV special made as well.

Characters
Some of the original Pillow People characters included:
 Mr. Sandman
 Pillow Fighter
 Punky Pillow
 Mr. Thunderclap
 Sweet Dreams
 Rock-a-bye Baby
 Big Footsteps
 Squeaky Door
 Window Rattler
 Cry Baby Giggles
 Hearts Throb

In culture
The Pillow Person "Window Rattler" can be seen on multiple episodes of the 1980s-90s TV show Full House, as D.J. Tanner's favorite stuffed animal.

References

External links 
 Toy website about Pillow People line

1980s toys
Products introduced in 1986
Stuffed toys